Arve Henriksen (born 22 March 1968) is a Norwegian trumpeter.

Career

Henriksen was born in Stranda and educated on the Jazz program at Trondheim Musikkonservatorium; he later studied  music pedagogy, while he played in «Bodega Band» (1987–88), «Luft» (1987–89), «Veslefrekk» from 1989, «Close Enough» 1990–92, «Nutrio» from 1990, and recorded with Bjørn Alterhaug and «Tre Små Kinesere» (1990). After graduating  in 1991, he joined the «Trio Midt-Norge» and «Piggy Bop».

He has played among others with Misha Alperin, Jon Balke's Magnetic North Orchestra, Nils Petter Molvær, Audun Kleive, Trygve Seim, Terje Isungset, Christian Wallumrød and recently with Iain Ballamy's Food for Quartet  and Supersilent, both bands signed on Rune Grammofon. He has also contributed to David Sylvian's Nine Horses project and his work, When Loud Weather Buffeted Naoshima.

He also sings; his unique wordless vocalising was central to Chiaroscuro, where he often sings in a soprano's range. The control over his head voice is such that in "Opening Image" he could quite easily be mistaken for a woman.

With Supersilent he has been a major contributor to one of the most acclaimed improvisational bands over the last 14 years in Norway, with collaborations with Terje Rypdal among others. John Paul Jones played with them at the Punkt festival 2010, in Kristiansand, Norway and again at Moldejazz 2012.

John Kellman of the All About Jazz magazine recognized Arve Henriksen/Jan Bang Double CD Release Show at The Punkt Festival, Kristiansand, Norway, September 2013, as no. 17 of his "Best Live Shows of 2013".

Honors 
2005: Buddyprisen
2007: Radka Toneff Memorial Award
2011: Kongsberg Jazz Award
2011: Paul Acket Award, North Sea Jazz
2016: Dr Honoris Causa at Gothenburg University

Discography

Solo albums 
2001: Sakuteiki (Rune Grammofon)
2004: Chiaroscuro (Rune Grammofon)
2007: Strjon (Rune Grammofon)
2008: Cartography (ECM Records)
2013: Places Of Worship (Rune Grammofon)
2014: The Nature Of Connections (Rune Grammofon)
2014: Chron (Rune Grammofon)
2014: Cosmic Creation (Rune Grammofon)
2017: Towards Language (Rune Grammofon)
2018: The Height Of The Reeds (Rune Grammofon)
2018: Composograph: A Synthesis Of Wood, Metal And Electronics (Arve Music)
2019: The timeless nowhere (Rune Grammofon), boxed set 4 X LP plus 2 X CD
2021: Mental Fatigue (Arve Music)
2021: Murimorphosis (Arve Music)

Compilations
2012: Solidification (Rune Grammofon)
2014: Chron|Cosmic Creation (Rune Grammofon)

Collaborative work 
2000: Daa (NorCD), with Terje Isungset and Karl Seglem
2000: Birth Wish (Pan M Records), with Christian Wallumrød, Jan Bang and Erik Honoré
2007: Sketches Of Spain (Nor Wind Records), with The Norwegian Wind Ensemble and Maria Schneider
2009: Ellivan (NorCD), with Elling Vanberg
2010: Clinamen (Off, Rat), with Giovanni Di Domenico and Tatsuhisa Yamamoto
2012: Black Swan (Rat Records), with Teun Verbruggen
2012: Uncommon Deities (P-Vine Records), with Jan Bang, Erik Honoré, David Sylvian and Sidsel Endresen
2012: Distare Sonanti (and/OAR), with Giovanni Di Domenico and Tatsuhisa Yamamoto
2014: World Of Glass (All Ice Records), with Terje Isungset
2016: Atmosphères with Tigran Hamasyan, Eivind Aarset, and Jan Bang (ECM)
2017: Rímur with Trio Mediæval (ECM)
2017: The Art Of Irrigation (All Ice Records), with Terje Isungset
2018: Pilgrim (ACT), with Janne Mark
2018: Illusion Of A Separate World with David Kollar (Hevhetia)

References

External links

AllAboutJazz - the musician's profile on AllAboutJazz.
Bungey, John (2007) "Arve Henriksen: Strjon" (review), The Times, May 26, 2007
Bungey, John (2009) "Arve Henriksen: Cartography" (review), The Times, January 10, 2009
Arve Henriksen: Places of Worship – review (5 stars) by John Fordham, October 24, 2013 at The Guardian

}

}

1968 births
Living people
Norwegian University of Science and Technology alumni
20th-century Norwegian multi-instrumentalists
21st-century Norwegian multi-instrumentalists
20th-century Norwegian trumpeters
21st-century Norwegian trumpeters
20th-century Norwegian male singers
20th-century Norwegian singers
21st-century Norwegian male singers
21st-century Norwegian singers
Norwegian jazz trumpeters
Male trumpeters
Norwegian jazz singers
Norwegian jazz composers
Rune Grammofon artists
ECM Records artists
People from Stranda
Musicians from Møre og Romsdal
Male jazz composers
Supersilent members
Generator X (band) members
Veslefrekk members